Slamscape is a video game developed and published by Viacom New Media for Windows and the PlayStation. The game features an original soundtrack by God Lives Underwater.

Gameplay
Slamscape is a game in which the players search an arena for hidden orbs while dealing with enemy creatures.

Reception
Next Generation reviewed the PlayStation version of the game, rating it one star out of five, and stated that "Definitely not for hardcore gamers, this title is for those who don't know any better."

Reviews
GameFan #47 (Vol 4, Issue 11) 1996 November
PC Gamer (1997 February)
Game.EXE #3 (Mar 1997)
Official UK PlayStation Magazine - 1997
GameSpot - Nov 07, 1996
GameSpot - Dec 01, 1996
Computer Gaming World - Jan, 1997
Computer Games Magazine - 1997
PC Player (Germany) - Apr, 1997

References

1996 video games
God Lives Underwater
PlayStation (console) games
Third-person shooters
Video games developed in the United States
Windows games